Puya venusta is a species of flowering plant in the family Bromeliaceae. This species is a rare plant found in certain portions of Chile including Punta Teatinos and Cerro La Campana. In La Campana National Park P. venusta is associated with the endangered Chilean Wine Palm, Jubaea chilensis, a palm that prehistorically had a significantly wider distribution.

References

 C. Michael Hogan. 2008. Chilean Wine Palm: Jubaea chilensis, GlobalTwitcher.com, ed. N. Stromberg
 Philip Wilson Rundel, Gloria Montenegro Rizzardini, G. Montenegro and Fabian M. Jaksic. 1998. Landscape Disturbance and Biodiversity in Mediterranean-type Ecosystems, Published by Springer, 447 pages  , 9783540644750

venusta
Taxa named by John Gilbert Baker
Taxa named by Rodolfo Amando Philippi